Lavrentis is a Greek given name and surname

 Lavrentis Dianellos, Greek actor
 Lavrentis Machairitsas, Greek rock musician
 Ioannis Lavrentis, Greek athlete

See also 
 Lavrentios Alexanidis, Greek judoka

 Lavrenti (given name)
 Lavrentiy (given name)
 Laurentius (disambiguation)